The AMX-VCI is one of the many variants of the French AMX-13 light tank. It was the front line APC of the French Army until replaced by the AMX-10P. It is still used by some countries, for example Mexico, where it goes under the name of DNC-1 and is armed with a 20mm cannon.

History 
Beginning in 1957, some 3,000 vehicles were produced. It was initially produced as the AMX-13 VTT, which carried ten infantrymen and was armed with either an AA-52 7.62 mm machine gun or a 12.7 mm M2 Browning machine gun in an open mounting. The final versions had a turret equipped with a 20mm light autocannon, producing a vehicle that can be seen as an early example of the infantry fighting vehicle.

Variants

The AMX-13 VCI itself was the basis for a number of variants:

AMX-VTP: Original APC variant armed with an open-mount light machine-gun
AMX-VTT (AMX-VCI): APC fitted with a turret mounted light machine-gun
AMX-LT: VTT based artillery fire control vehicle
AMX-PC: VTT based Command Post
AMX-VCA: VTT based 155 mm Support Vehicle designed to accompany the Mk F3 SPH
AMX-VCG: Combat engineer version
AMX-VCI 12.7: Version with a 50 calibre (12.7 mm) HMG used by France and the Netherlands
AMX-VCI M-56: Fitted with a 20mm cannon
AMX-VCPM de 81: VTT-based 81 mm Mortar Carrier
AMX-VCPM de 120: VTT-based 120 mm Mortar Carrier
AMX-VCTB: VTT-based Ambulance
AMX-VTT avec tourelle NA2: Fitted with ATGM launcher
AMX-VTT ROLAND: Roland SPAAML
AMX-VTT Version 1987: Modernised version with all the tank automotive improvements
AMX-VTT with Minotaur Mine System: Minotaur scatterable mine-laying system fitted on the rear
AMX-13 RATAC: VTT-based RATAC ground surveillance radar vehicle
AMX DOZER: bulldozer blade equipped version
AMX-13 VCPC: Argentinian Army version of the AMX-13 VCI
AMX-13 mod.56 VCI: Belgian Army version with a .30 Browning mounted in a CALF38 turret
AMX-13 mod.56 [81 mm mortar carrier]: Belgian Army version
AMX-13 mod.56 [command post]: Belgian Army version
AMX-13 mod.56 [ENTAC atgm]: Belgian Army version with a rear-mounted ENTAC missile launcher
AMX-13 mod.56 [cargo]: Belgian Army version
AMX-VTT TOW: Dutch Army version with a TOW launcher on a cupola
AMX-GWT (GeWonden Transport): Dutch army version of the VCTB
AMX-VCI Retrofit: Indonesian Army modernization with the hull lengthened 20 cm to accommodate Navistar 400hp engine, redesigned engine deck, frontal armor, and exhaust, also modification to transmission and suspension.
DNC-1: Mexican Army local designation, slightly modernized version with a diesel engine and a 20 mm. cannon, upgraded by SEDENA

Combat history

Lebanon
A total of 60 AMX-VCIs were delivered to the Lebanese Army in 1971-72, with additional 30 vehicles being reportedly delivered in May 1983. A number of VCIs were seized by the Amal Movement militia and the pro-Israeli South Lebanon Army (SLA) militia in February 1984 after the defeat of the Lebanese government forces by Shia Muslim and Druze militias during the Mountain War. The captured vehicles were quickly pressed into service by the SLA, who used them during the South Lebanon conflict (1985–2000) until the collapse of the militia in the wake of the Israeli withdrawal of April 2000; those used by Amal were returned to the Lebanese Army earlier in October 1990. VCIs up-armed with US M40 106mm recoilless rifles were also employed by Lebanese Army General Michel Aoun's loyalist troops during the Elimination War waged against his Christian rivals of the Lebanese Forces (LF) militia at East Beirut in February 1990, who in turn also managed to capture some VCIs from Army barracks, which were returned in 1991-94.

Operators

Current operators

: Argentine Army
: VTT/VCA and command post versions in service with the Cypriot National Guard.
: Ecuadorian Army
: Indonesian Army 200 acquired in the 1960s. As of 2016, only 75 vehicles remain in service.
: Mexican Army 409 in service
: Qatar Armed Forces (Army)
: Sudan People's Armed Forces
: Venezuelan Army
: United Arab Emirates Army

Former operators

: Belgian Army, successor to the M75 armored personnel carrier. AMX-13 mod.56 VTT (305 vehicles), AMX-13 mod.56 PC (72 vehicles), AMX-13 mod.56 Cargo (58 vehicles), AMX-13 mod.56 Mor (90 vehicles), AMX-13 mod.56 MILAN (86 vehicles) and AMX-13 mod.56 ENTAC (30 vehicles). Replaced by the M113A1-B and the AIFV-B.
: French Army, replaced by the AMX-10P.
: 90 vehicles in service with the Lebanese Army from surplus French Army stocks between 1971 and 1993. Replaced by the M113 and the AIFV-B-C25.
: Dutch Army, 345 AMX-PRI (infantry fighting vehicle), 162 PRCO (command), 46 PRVR (cargo) et 46 PRGWT (ambulance). 67 PRI modified to mortar carriers (PRMR) et 26 to tank destroyers (PRAT), with TOW missiles
 Amal Movement militia: ex-Lebanese Army vehicles in service between 1984 and 1990.
 Lebanese Forces: ex-Lebanese Army vehicles in service between 1990 and 1994.
 South Lebanon Army: ex-Lebanese Army vehicles in service between 1984 and 2000.
: Italian Army, AMX-13 VCI (various versions) (80-100 vehicles)

Evaluation-only operators
: Israel Defense Forces, captured 2 abandoned Lebanese Army VCIs during the 1982 Lebanon War.

See also
AMX-13
AMX-10P
List of AFVs
List of weapons of the Lebanese Civil War

Notes

References

 Christopher F. Foss, Jane's Tank and Combat Vehicle Recognition Guide, HarperCollins Publishers, London 2002. 
Joseph Hokayem, L'armée libanaise pendant la guerre: un instrument du pouvoir du président de la République (1975-1985), Lulu.com, Beyrouth 2012. , 1291036601 (in French) – 
M.P. Robinson, Peter Lau and Guy Gibeau, Images of War: The AMX 13 Light Tank, A Complete History – rare photographs from wartime archives, Pen & Sword Military, Barnsley 2018. 
 Samer Kassis, 30 Years of Military Vehicles in Lebanon, Beirut: Elite Group, 2003. 
 Samer Kassis, Véhicules Militaires au Liban/Military Vehicles in Lebanon 1975-1981, Trebia Publishing, Chyah 2012. 
 Steven J. Zaloga, Tank battles of the Mid-East Wars (2): The wars of 1973 to the present, Concord Publications, Hong Kong 2003.  –  
Zachary Sex & Bassel Abi-Chahine, Modern Conflicts 2 – The Lebanese Civil War, From 1975 to 1991 and Beyond, Modern Conflicts Profile Guide Volume II, AK Interactive, 2021. ISBN 8435568306073

External links 

Photos and file on the AMX-13 VCI at ArmyRecognition.com

Tracked armoured personnel carriers
Armoured personnel carriers of France
Military equipment introduced in the 1950s